Mitchell te Vrede (born 7 August 1991) is a professional footballer who plays as a striker for Al Dhafra. He formerly played for Excelsior, Feyenoord, Heerenveen, Boluspor, NAC Breda, Al-Fateh and Abha. Born in the Netherlands, he represents the Suriname national team.

Club career
Te Vrede started playing football for AFC in Amsterdam and joined the AZ youth academy in 2008. In the 2010–11 season, he was part of the first-team squad, but did not make his debut. In 2011 he signed a two-year deal with Excelsior.

He moved to Feyenoord ahead of the 2012–13 season, where he signed a two-year contract with an option for another two years. He mostly acted as a backup to starting striker Graziano Pellè during his time at the club. In 2014, the option was triggered by Feyenoord, keeping him at the club for another two years. He was a part of Feyenoord's successful 2014–15 UEFA Europa League campaign, where the club would become the group winner in that tournament, partly by winning 2–0 at home against defending title holders Sevilla, after goals from Jens Toornstra and Karim El Ahmadi, and winning 0–3 in the other match against Standard Liège. In the knockout phase, Feyenoord managed a 1–1 draw away against Roma. Feyenoord lost 1–2 at home, after Te Vrede was sent off.

In August 2015, Te Vrede signed a two-year contract with Heerenveen, with an option for an extra year. It was reported that the Frisian club paid around €500,000 to secure his services.

In January 2017, he exchanged Heerenveen for Turkish club Boluspor, where he signed a one-and-a-half-year contract. On 17 October 2017, it was announced that his contract with Boluspor had been terminated. In the winter break of the 2017–18 season, he signed with NAC Breda where he would compete for a starting position with loanee Sadiq Umar. In the 2018–19 season, he suffered relegation as a part of the NAC team. He afterwards signed with Saudi Arabian club Al-Fateh in June 2019.

On 11 August 2021, te Vrede joined Abha. On 30 July 2022, te Vrede joined Al Dhafra on a free transfer.

International career
Born in the Netherlands, Te Vrede is of Surinamese descent. Te Vrede gained one cap for the Netherlands U18 team; a friendly against Turkey on 1 April 2009, where he came on as a substitute for Rick ten Voorde in the 65th minute in a 3–0 win.

In May 2021, it was announced that he was eligible for the Suriname national team, and would make himself available for a call-up from national team coach Dean Gorré. He debuted with the Suriname national team in a 6–0 2022 FIFA World Cup qualification win over Bermuda on 4 June 2021.

Personal life
Various Turkish media reported on 3 April 2017 that Te Vrede was suffering from cancer. Later that evening, he responded to Dutch newspaper De Telegraaf that he had had a tumor in his testicle, but it had been surgically removed, as there had been no metastases yet.

References

External links
 
 Voetbal International profile 
 

1991 births
Living people
Sportspeople from Amstelveen
Surinamese footballers
Suriname international footballers
Dutch footballers
Netherlands youth international footballers
Dutch sportspeople of Surinamese descent
Association football forwards
Excelsior Rotterdam players
Feyenoord players
SC Heerenveen players
Boluspor footballers
NAC Breda players
Al-Fateh SC players
Abha Club players
Al Dhafra FC players
Eredivisie players
TFF First League players
Saudi Professional League players
UAE Pro League players
Surinamese expatriate footballers
Surinamese expatriate sportspeople in Turkey
Surinamese expatriate sportspeople in Saudi Arabia
Dutch expatriate footballers
Dutch expatriate sportspeople in Turkey
Dutch expatriate sportspeople in Saudi Arabia
Dutch expatriate sportspeople in the United Arab Emirates
Expatriate footballers in Turkey
Expatriate footballers in Saudi Arabia
Expatriate footballers in the United Arab Emirates
Footballers from North Holland